Bruna Veronez Primati (born February 2, 1997 in São Paulo) is a Brazilian swimmer.

At the 2014 Summer Youth Olympics in Nanjing, Primati finished 5th in the 4 × 100 metre freestyle relay, 6th in the 800 metre freestyle, 7th in the 400 metre freestyle and 16th in the 200 metre individual medley.

At the 2015 South American Swimming Youth Championships, held in Lima, Peru, Primati won four gold medals in the 200-metre, 400-metre and 800-metre freestyle, and in the 200-metre individual medley.

At the 2015 Pan American Games in Toronto, Ontario, Canada, Primati won a silver medal in the 4 × 200 metre freestyle relay, by participating at heats. She also finished 7th in the Women's 800 metre freestyle.

References

Brazilian female medley swimmers
1997 births
Living people
Swimmers from São Paulo
Brazilian female freestyle swimmers
Swimmers at the 2015 Pan American Games
Swimmers at the 2014 Summer Youth Olympics
Pan American Games silver medalists for Brazil
Pan American Games medalists in swimming
Medalists at the 2015 Pan American Games
21st-century Brazilian women